Yogi Haider (born Shamshad Haider) is a yoga teacher living in Pakistan. He is the founder of Yoga Pakistan and Way of Nature through which he teaches yoga and meditation. He studied yoga in Burma, Tibet, Nepal and India, including from S. N. Goenka. Haider belongs to Pakistan's Punjab province. He has been teaching yoga since 1994. His organisation teaches yoga to over 10,000 students in Islamabad, Karachi, Rawalpindi and Lahore.

His students include Pakistani politicians such as Qaim Ali Shah (Chief Minister of Sindh) and Ghulam Mustafa Khar (former Governor of Punjab). Haider gives free public training. Haider says that his ambition is to emulate Ramdev Baba and popularise yoga amongst Pakistanis. Haider has been called as the face of yoga in Pakistan. He has been described coming across as an Indian yogi, simple, peaceful and confident. He speaks English, Urdu, Hindi, Punjabi, Arabic and Nepalese.

References

Living people
Pakistani yogis
Pakistani educators
Yoga teachers
Pakistani expatriates in India
Pakistani expatriates in Nepal
Year of birth missing (living people)